Reşit Karabacak (5 July 1954 – 19 November 2020) was a Turkish wrestler who competed in the 1984 Summer Olympics.

Biography
Born in Erzurum, Turkey, he became European champion in 1983 in Budapest, beating Efraim Kamberov (Efraim Kamberoğlu), an ethnic Turk from Bulgaria.

Karabacak died from COVID-19 in Bursa on 19 November 2020, at the age of 66, during the COVID-19 pandemic in Turkey.

References

External links
 

1954 births
2020 deaths
Olympic wrestlers of Turkey
Wrestlers at the 1984 Summer Olympics
Turkish male sport wrestlers
Deaths from the COVID-19 pandemic in Turkey